El padre de Caín is a two-part Spanish television miniseries directed by Salvador Calvo adapting the novel of the same name by Rafael Vera. It stars Quim Gutiérrez, Aura Garrido and Oona Chaplin.

Premise 

Cast 
 Quim Gutiérrez as Eloy.
 Aura Garrido as Begoña.
 Oona Chaplin as Mercedes.
  as sargento Delgado.
 Luis Bermejo as comandante de Intxaurrondo.
 Luis Zahera as Bermejo.
 Eduardo Lloveras as Carmelo.
 Cristina Plazas as madre de Mercedes.
 Ricardo Gómez as Daniel.
 Patrick Criado as Ander.

Production and release 
Produced by Telecinco in collaboration with Boomerang TV, it was filmed in Asturias (including Avilés), the Madrid region and San Sebastián. Filming wrapped by August 2015 after 5 weeks of production. The series premiered on 6 December 2016. The first part earned good viewership figures (3,223,000 average viewers and a 19% audience share). The finale aired a day later, on 7 December, commanding significantly less attention from the audience (2,518,000 viewers and a 14.5% share).

References 

2010s Spanish drama television series
Television shows filmed in Spain
Television series based on Spanish novels
Spanish-language television shows
2016 Spanish television series debuts
2016 Spanish television series endings
Television shows set in the Basque Country (autonomous community)
Spanish television miniseries
Spanish television series about terrorism
Television series set in the 1980s
Telecinco network series
Television series by Boomerang TV